Brian Anthony Bailey (born September 14, 1974), best known under his stage name Hittman (acronym for Highly Intense Tongue Talents Make All Nervous), is an American West Coast rapper, songwriter and record producer originating from Los Angeles, California.

Career
Hittman was signed into Dr. Dre's Aftermath Entertainment label in 1998. He received various guest appearances, rapping on 9 tracks off Dr. Dre's 2001 album, making him the most featured artist. Under Dr. Dre's label, he failed to release his own album, and soon faded into obscurity and left the label.

In 2000, he released his most popular single, "Last Dayz", featured on the B-side of the Dr. Dre single, "Forgot About Dre". In the music video for "Forgot About Dre", "Last Dayz" got its own one-minute segment at the end. After leaving Aftermath, he released his own solo album in 2005, Hittmanic Verses under Sick Bay Records.

Though he rarely continues to provide guest verses for artists, he has produced tracks, such as "Progression" from Dizzy Wright's The Golden Age.

Discography

Albums
Hittmanic Verses (2005)

EPs
Big Hitt Rising (2008)

Charted songs
"Let's Get High" (1999)
"Ackrite" (1999)
"Housewife" (1999)
"Xxplosive" (1999)
"Some L.A. Niggaz" (1999)
"Last Dayz" (2000)
"Light Speed" (2000)
"Big Ego's(feat Hittman)
" Housewife (feat Hittman & kurupt)

References

1974 births
Living people
African-American male rappers
West Coast hip hop musicians
Rappers from Los Angeles
Aftermath Entertainment artists
Gangsta rappers
21st-century American rappers
21st-century American male musicians
21st-century African-American musicians
20th-century African-American people